Juli may refer to:

 Juli (band), a rock/pop band from Germany
 "Juli", by Ryan Adams from the album Prisoner (B-Sides)
 Juli District, one district of the province Chucuito in Puno Region, Peru
 , the capital of Juli District
 Juli (footballer) (born 1981), Spanish footballer whose full name is Julián Cerdá Vicente
 Juli (Street Fighter), character from Street Fighter
 Juli, female nickname, for Julia, Juliette, Julianna, Julianne or similar names
 Juli Briskman, politician from the U.S. state of Virginia
 Julis, short for Junge Liberale, the Young Liberals youth organization in Germany and Austria

See also
 Julis, village and local council in Israel
 July (disambiguation)
 Julie (disambiguation)
 Juliette (disambiguation)
 Juliet
 Julieta (disambiguation)
 Julianne